Mist (also known as Angae and The Foggy Town) is a 1967 drama film about a businessman, Yun Gi-jun (played by Sung-il Shin), who married into wealth and lives in Seoul, travels back to Mujin, his hometown. He embarks on a love affair with the local music teacher Ha In-suk (played by Yun Jeong-hie) and starts questioning his life choices.

References 
Films by Korean directors
1967 drama films
Films based on books
1960s films

External links